John Fairbank may refer to:
 John King Fairbank, American historian
 John Henry Fairbank, surveyor, oilman, inventor, banker, politician and fire chief in Ontario

See also
 John Fairbanks, American landscape painter